Deepanath Channa Perera (born 16 August 1965 as චන්න පෙරේරා [Sinhala]), is an actor in Sri Lankan cinema and television as well as a filmmaker and screenplay writer.

Personal life
Channa Perera was born on 16 August 1965 as the eldest of four sons. His father Piyasena Perera was a Director of Education who was in-charge  of special education in Sri Lanka. His mother, Vineetha Piyasena, was a teaching instructress. Perera was educated at Sri Sumangala Boys' School, Panadura and then from Royal College Colombo. He completed A/L from bio stream and then took over a Banking job.

He is married to popular actress Gayathri Dias. He met Gayathri during the teledrama Makara Vijithaya. They got married on 26 September 1996. The couple has two daughters - Maleesha Parindya and Duasha Adithya. Elder daughter Maleesha completed education from Musaeus College.Duasha is currently studying at Royal Institute.

Career
His maiden cinematic experience came through 1994 film Sujatha directed by Daya Wimalaweera. Since then, he acted in many dramatic roles particularly in romantic supportive roles. His has acted in many popular serials including Golu Hadawatha, Sathpura Wesiyo, Senehewanthayo, Sath Mahala, Sakwa Lihiniyo and Sooriya Daruwo.

He entered in film direction with the 2006 blockbuster Anjalika. The film won many awards at local film festivals. He introduced Kollywood actress Pooja Umashankar to Sri Lankan film industry with title character in Anjalika. He directed his first television serial, Punchi Weerayo, which became a cult in Sri Lankan television. His next directorial film Sanda Diya Salu, which is an Indian-Sri Lankan joint production was planned to release for nearly 30 theaters of NFC Ridma circuit cinemas, ten Tamil and Telugu copies. But the screening was postponed by many disputes.

Some of his television serials

 Awasan Horawa
 Bharyawo
 Dahas Gawdura
 Dedunu Yanaya
 Diya Suliya
 Eka Gei Kurullo
 Golu Hadawatha
 Kaneru
 Makara Vijithaya
 Prema Parami
 Sahas Gaw Dura
 Sakwa Lihiniyo
 Sanda Hiru Tharu
 Sathmahala
 Sathpura Wesiyo
 Sawsiri Uyana
 Senehewanthayo 
 Sooriya Daruwo
 Sudu Mahaththuru
 Suwanda Padma 
 Tharupaba
 Thimira Pauwa
 Vihanga Geethaya

Television serials directed
 Punchi Weerayo 1 and 2 
 Wassanaye Hiru Evidin 
 Sanda Diya Arana
 Tikiri Hapannu 1 and 2

Filmography

As an actor
{| class="wikitable" style="font-size:95%;"
! Year !! Film !! Role !! Ref.
|-
|| 1994 || Sujatha || Sanath || 
|-
|| 1994 || Dhawala Pushpaya || uncredited role || 
|-
|| 1995 || Mama Baya Ne Shyama || || 
|-
|| 1995 || Chandiyage Putha || Suresh || 
|-
|| 1997 || Ninja Sri Lanka ||  || 
|-
|| 1998 || Gini Avi Saha Gini Keli || || 
|-
|| 1999 || Thirtha Yathra || Kusal || 
|-
|| 2000 || Undaya || Murthi Palihawadana || 
|-
|| 2002 || Seethala Gini Kandu ||  || 
|-
|| 2004 || Mille Soya || Chamara || 
|-
|| 2006 || Anjalika || Thivanka || 
|-
|| 2010 || Hadawatha Mal Yayai || Himal || 
|-
|| 2012 || Senasuru Maruwa || Nisal || 
|-
|| 2014 || Kalpanthe Sihinayak || Kalpa Wickramasinghe || 
|-
|| TBD || Inda Nimidam ||South Indian Movie|| 
|-
|| TBD || Mayavi || Senehas ||
|-
|| TBD || Bambara Wasanthe ||  ||
|-
|| TBD || Yugathra || Visal/Sagara ||

As a film director

Awards and accolades
He has won several awards at the local film festivals and television festivals, both for acting and direction.

Sarasaviya Awards

|-
|| 2006 ||| Anjalika || Most Popular Actor ||

Sumathi Awards

|-
|| 1998 ||| Thimira Pauwa || Merit Award || 
|-
|| 2001 ||| Punchi Weerayo || Best Creative Director || 
|-
|| 2001 ||| Peoples' vote || Most Popular Actor || 
|-
|| 2002 ||| Peoples' vote || Most Popular Actor || 
|-
|| 2003 ||| Peoples' vote || Most Popular Actor || 
|-
|| 2004 ||| Nannadunannee || Best Supporting Actor || 
|-
|| 2016 ||| Rathu Ahasa || Jury Special Award ||

Signis OCIC Awards

|-
|| 2009 ||| Anjalika || Best Direction ||

Derana Music Video Awards

|-
|| 2008 ||| Anjalika || Best Visualized film song ||

SLIM-Nielsen Peoples Awards

|-
|| 2008 ||| Anjalika || Most Popular Film ||

Hiru Golden Film Awards

|-
|| 2014||| Senasuru Maruwa || Best Actor ||

Derana Film Awards

|-
|| 2014||| Senasuru Maruwa || Best Actor ||

References

External links
අපි බැදලා අවුරුදු 17 - Channa Perera and Gayathri Dias
 Chat with Gayathri Dias
හිතගියේ ගයාත්‍රිට විතරයි... - Channa perera
කුණුවලට මිනිස්සු රහ වැටෙනවා - Channa Perera
චන්නයි කෙල්ලෝ දෙන්නයි

20th-century Sri Lankan male actors
Sri Lankan film directors
Alumni of Royal College, Colombo
Living people
21st-century Sri Lankan male actors
Sri Lankan male television actors
1980 births